The 2016–17 Scottish Junior Cup was the 131st season of the Scottish Junior Cup, the national knockout tournament for member clubs of the Scottish Junior Football Association. The winner of this competition entered the following season's Scottish Cup at the preliminary round stage.

Calendar
The provisional dates for each round of the 2016–17 tournament were as follows:

Drawn matches are replayed the following weekend. Replays ending in a draw proceed direct to penalty shootout. Semi-finals are played home and away over two legs, subject to decision by the SJFA management committee.

First round
The six Junior clubs qualified for this season's Scottish Cup, were not included in the draw for the first round:
 Auchinleck Talbot - West of Scotland Super League Premier Division champions
 Banks O' Dee - North Superleague champions (automatic qualifiers via National Club Licensing (NCL) award in any case)
 Beith Juniors - Scottish Junior Cup winners
 Bonnyrigg Rose Athletic - East Superleague champions
 Girvan - in possession of NCL award
 Linlithgow Rose - in possession of NCL award

The first round draw took place at Hampden Park, Glasgow on 25 August 2016.

Replays

Second round
The second round draw took place at Bellsdale Park, Beith, on 1 October 2016.

1 Tie played at Clachnacuddin F.C.
2 Tie played at Larkhall Thistle F.C.

Replays

Third round
The third round draw took place at the offices of The Scottish Sun newspaper, Glasgow, on 1 November 2016.

3 Tie played at St Anthony's F.C.4 Tie played at Hamilton Academical F.C.

Replays

Fourth round
The fourth round draw took place at the offices of Evening Times newspaper, Glasgow, on 30 November 2016.

5 Tie played at Benburb F.C.6 Tie played at St Anthony's F.C.

Replays

Fifth round
The fifth round draw took place at Glasgow City Chambers, on 31 January 2017.

7 Tie played at St Anthony's F.C.

Replay
{| border=0 cellpadding=4 cellspacing=0
|valign="top"|

Quarter-finals

The draw for the quarter-finals was made on 28 February 2017.

Semi-finals
The draw for the semi finals took place on 28 March 2017.

First leg

Second leg

Glenafton Athletic win 1–0 on aggregate.

Auchinleck Talbot win 1–0 on aggregate.

Final
The Final of The ETHX Energy Junior Cup was played at Rugby Park, Kilmarnock on Sunday 4 June with a 4.15pm kick off. The game was televised live by BBC ALBA.

References

4
Scottish Junior Cup seasons